Ashton Applewhite (born 1952) is a writer and activist based in Brooklyn, New York, United States.

She is the author of This Chair Rocks: A Manifesto Against Ageism and a leading spokesperson for the emerging movement to raise awareness of ageism and to dismantle it. A co-founder of the  Old School Anti-Ageism Clearinghouse, she has been recognized by the New York Times, The New Yorker, National Public Radio, and the American Society on Aging as an expert on ageism. She speaks widely at venues that have included the TED mainstage and the United Nations, has written for Harper’s, the Guardian, and the New York Times, and is the voice of Yo, Is This Ageist? She has been named as a Fellow by the Knight Foundation, The New York Times, Yale Law School, and the Royal Society for the Arts.

In 2016, Applewhite joined the PBS site Next Avenue’s annual list of 50 Influencers in Aging as their Influencer of the Year. In 2022, she appeared on HelpAgeUSA’s inaugural 60 Over 60 List and on Fe:maleOneZero’s first international edition of 40 over 40 – The World’s Most Inspiring Women, and received the Maggie Kuhn Award from Presbyterian Senior Services.

Applewhite is also the author of  Cutting Loose: Why Women Who End Their Marriages Do So Well, described by Ms. magazine as “rocket fuel for launching new lives.” As the pseudonymous author of the Truly Tasteless Jokes series, she was the first person to have four books on the New York Times best-seller list and was a clue on “Jeopardy."

Works 
 Applewhite, Ashton. This Chair Rocks: A Manifesto Against Ageism, New York: Celadon Books, March 5, 2019. 
 Applewhite, Ashton. This Chair Rocks: A Manifesto Against Ageism, Networked Books, Inc., March 15, 2016.  
 Applewhite, Ashton. Cutting Loose: Why Women Who End Their Marriages Do So Well, New York: HarperCollins, 1997, ; reissued on 2017 with new introduction by the author, .

References

External links
This Chair Rocks
Yo, Is This Ageist?

1952 births
Ageism
American activists
American humorists
American memoirists
American non-fiction writers
American feminist writers
HIV/AIDS activists
Living people
People from Brooklyn
20th-century pseudonymous writers
21st-century pseudonymous writers
Pseudonymous women writers